Only One is the seventh Korean language studio album (fifteenth overall) by South Korean singer BoA, released in South Korea on July 22, 2012, by SM Entertainment. BoA composed the title track of the album, a first in her twelve-year career. It was the 46th best-selling album of 2012 in South Korea, selling over 34,000 copies.

Background and release
On July 16, 2012, SM Entertainment announced that BoA will be coming back with her seventh Korean album titled Only One, two years after the release of her sixth album Hurricane Venus. For the choreography of her title track, "Only One", she enlisted the help of Nappytabs who also contributed on the choreography on her upcoming dance flick Make Your Move 3D. SM Entertainment also announced that BoA will be promoting the album via her own comeback show BoA 4354. The number represents the days BoA has been in the entertainment industry.

The album has two editions: regular and limited. Along with the album, fans can order different bundles that come with a photobook and/or poster. However, the album only became available in the Philippines after almost a year of release on July 5, 2013.

Chart performance and sales
The title track "Only One" was released digitally on July 22, 2012. It entered the K-pop Billboard Hot 100 at number 12 and peaked at number 2 on its fourth week. It remained in the top 3 for four weeks. It stayed in the top of the Gaon charts for weeks, and has sold about 2 million singles as of October.

The physical album was released on July 25, 2012, and sold over 28,000 copies on its first six days of release. Since August 2012, the album has sold more than 34,000 copies in total. The album also got more than 934,059 digital downloads according to Gaon Chart. The album is her best selling Korean album so far with the combination of digital and physical sales.

Track listing

Charts

Weekly charts

Monthly charts

Year-end charts

References 

2012 albums
BoA albums
Korean-language albums
SM Entertainment albums